The 2012 Judo World Masters was held in Almaty, Kazakhstan, from 14 to 15 January 2012.

Medal summary

Medal table

Men's events

Women's events

References

External links
 

IJF World Masters
World Masters
Judo
Masters 2012
Judo
January 2012 sports events in Asia